Milk chocolate is a solid chocolate confectionery containing cocoa, sugar and milk. It is the most consumed type of chocolate. Chocolate was originally sold and consumed as a beverage in pre-Columbian times, and upon its introduction to Western Europe. Major milk chocolate producers include Ferrero, Hershey, Mondelez, Mars and Nestlé. Between them, they are responsible for over half of the chocolate sold worldwide. Although four-fifths of all milk chocolate is sold in the United States and Europe, increasingly large amounts are consumed in China and Latin America. While taste and texture have been key to its success, milk chocolate has also historically been promoted as a healthy food, particularly for children. Recent evidence has shown that it may provide antioxidant health benefits.

The word chocolate arrived in the English language about 1600, but initially described dark chocolate. The first use of the term "milk chocolate" was for a beverage brought to London from Jamaica in 1687, but it was not until the Swiss inventor Daniel Peter successfully combined cocoa and condensed milk in 1875 that the milk chocolate bar was invented. Switzerland quickly developed as the centre of milk chocolate production, particularly after the development of the conche by Rodolphe Lindt, and was increasingly exporting to an international market. Milk chocolate became mainstream at the beginning of the twentieth century following the launch of Milka, Cadbury Dairy Milk and the Hershey bar, inducing a dramatic increase in world cocoa consumption. At the same time, milk chocolate was combined with other ingredients, like nougat, to form a wide variety of bars, including Toblerone in 1908, Goo Goo Cluster in 1912 and Kit Kat in 1935. The global spread of milk chocolate continued into the next century, along with increasing consolidation in the market. A more recent development has been the rise of Fair Trade and UTZ Certified chocolate aiming to provide ethical assurances for customers. In 2018, the market for milk chocolate was worth $63.2 billion.

History

The word "chocolate" was first used in English about 1600. The first instance of "milk chocolate" appeared soon after, referring to a drink of chocolate combined with milk. In 1687, Hans Sloane, an Irish physician and collector, introduced the beverage to London after seeing the people of Jamaica enjoying the drink. The preparation was known for its medicinal properties, and was manufactured by Nicholas Sanders and William White, and was soon joined by other milk chocolates around the city. From there, milk chocolate spread, first to France, where the pharmacist to Louis XVI, Sulpice Debauve, introduced the drink to the Court, and then further afield, reaching as far as the United States by 1834. Meanwhile, in Dresden in the German Confederation, Jordan & Timaeus were developing a mechanism to produce hard chocolate using steam power. On 23 May 1839, they advertised a solid chocolate containing milk, calling it "steam chocolate". However, when Fry's of Bristol in the UK created the first chocolate bar in 1847, they used dark chocolate.

In 1875, the Swiss entrepreneur and chocolatier Daniel Peter, based in Vevey and related to the Cailler family, first successfully combined cocoa mass, cocoa butter, and sugar with condensed milk, recently created by his neighbour and friend Henri Nestlé, to produce milk chocolate. The process was further refined by another Swiss chocolatier, Rodolphe Lindt, who developed the conche in 1879, which created a smoother product. However, it is only after many years of fine-tuning that the original formula was developed and, in 1887, the Gala Peter brand was finally launched. Daniel Peter called his product 'Gala' after the Greek word meaning 'milk'. The success of Gala Peter opened a breach into which all the manufacturers rushed. Not only did milk soften the bitterness of chocolate and refined its taste, but it also lowered its production cost due to a lower cocoa content. As a consequence, Peter's recipe leaked to other nearby manufacturers: Cailler and Kohler. In 1898, Cailler opened its new factory at Broc, where milk chocolate began to be produced on a large scale. Peter also opened a larger factory at Orbe in 1901, before merging with Kohler. The same year, Suchard of Neuchâtel launched the Milka brand; Carl Russ-Suchard had previously developed a first milk bar in 1896. The chocolate industry also expanded in the late nineteenth century with the establishment of new companies, such as Frey and Tobler. From these developments, Switzerland soon dominated the chocolate market. Production increased dramatically, and by 1905, the country was producing  of chocolate, a vast proportion of it exported.

Meanwhile, there were other developments outside Switzerland. Swiss dominance was challenged in 1905 by a product from England, Cadbury Dairy Milk. Although there had been other milk chocolates produced outside Switzerland before – Cadbury themselves had produced one in 1897 – they were coarse and generally inferior to the Swiss varieties, and consequently suffered from low sales. In contrast, Dairy Milk quickly rose in prominence and, by the 1920s, was the bestselling chocolate in the UK. Simultaneously, in 1900, Milton Hershey had introduced the first Hershey bar, which revolutionised the popularity of milk chocolate in the United States. Although initially only available in Pennsylvania, by 1906 it was sold across the country. Popularity blossomed, particularly following World War I, when the United States Army issued chocolate bars to troops, for many their first taste of milk chocolate. By 1911, Peter's milk chocolate recipe represented half of the world's chocolate consumption. Milk chocolate became the standard of what the public thought chocolate should be.

As a result of the increasing popularity of chocolate, especially among the working and middle-class, cocoa consumption began to grow extraordinarily; global demand grew 800 percent between 1880 and 1900. To meet these demands, cocoa production expanded, notably in West Africa, where the Forastero variety began to be mass cultivated in the early twentieth century. Although considered inferior to the Criollo variety, the Forastero type bean is more suited for the manufacture of milk chocolate and is cheaper to produce owing to its higher yields. Countries in West Africa eventually dominated world production of cocoa. Conversely, milk became the critical ingredient. Contrary to cocoa and sugar, milk spoils quickly, therefore it cannot be stored for long periods of time. This favoured the implantation of large factories (as well as new populations of workers) in the countryside, where abundant fresh milk supplies are readily available. The Cailler factory of Broc and the Hershey factory of Derry Township are typical examples.

Over the decades, milk chocolate manufacture spread worldwide and new brands appeared. In 1910, Arthur and George Ensor created the first milk chocolate in Canada, using milk from Jersey cows. At the same time, Belgian chocolate production also expanded rapidly. From small beginnings in the 1870s, by the 1920s, there were ninety chocolate manufacturers around Brussels alone. In 1926, Meiji brought out their bar, the first example to be made in Japan. Milk chocolate swiftly dominated chocolate sales in most markets. It even found a place during World War II, when US troops carried D Ration chocolate, nicknamed Logan Bars after Quartermaster Paul Logan, as an emergency supply. At the same time, new ways of presenting chocolate appeared, from different shapes, like Cadbury Buttons, to the profusion of boxed varieties that became a feature of Belgian chocolate.

At the same time, the number of independent manufacturers declined sharply. The first consolidations in the industry were in Switzerland, where the takeover of Lindt by Sprüngli took place in 1899, and Nestlé had already emerged as the largest manufacture in the country by 1929. However, pace quickened in the latter half of the century. During the last three decades of the twentieth century, there were over 200 takeovers in the industry. By 2001, over half the global chocolate market was held by 17 companies. By 2013, the top four manufacturers, Mondelez, Mars, Nestlé and Ferrero, comprised 49 percent of the sales. This has continued; for example, in 2015, Thorntons, the British chocolatier that in four years before had produced the largest chocolate bar in the world weighing , was taken over by Ferrero.

In 2018, the global market for milk chocolate was worth $63.2 billion, and is expected to approach $73 billion by 2024. Consumption is dominated by the United States and Europe, which between them consumed over 80 percent of global production. However, the new century saw expansion in different markets. For example, between 2000 and 2013, the areas that saw the highest growth included the Middle East and Africa (where retail value rose 239 percent), Latin America (up 228 percent). Even in China and Japan, which traditionally are places of very low milk consumption, milk chocolate sales increased at the start of the 21st Century. Between 1999 and 2003, Chinese chocolate imports rose from $17.7 million to $50 million. By 2007, over 38 percent of chocolate sales in China were milk chocolate. By 2018, the value of sales by Japanese chocolatier Meiji was approaching that of the top producers in Europe, and the total sales by the group had surpassed the total for all confectionery sales by Hershey, putting the American company outside a top five ranking.

Although dark chocolate regained some popularity in the late twentieth century, milk chocolate remains the most preferred and consumed type of chocolate.

Nutrition

While all milk chocolate contains cocoa, milk and sugar, the proportion of these ingredients varies between countries and brands, which in turn affects its nutritional value. The driving force for these differences is taste. For example, Belgian chocolate is known for its mild milky flavour, while some Russian brands have a strong cocoa taste. The taste drives the ingredients, although these are also affected by other factors, particularly economics. For example, cost is the main reason for the introduction of cocoa butter replacements like coconut and palm oil. However, there are also regulatory reasons. In 1973, for example, the European Union decreed that chocolate must have a minimum of 35 percent dry cocoa solids. More recently, China has also introduced legislation to require locally produced milk chocolate to contain 25 percent cocoa butter.

All these have effects on human health and in the 21st Century, milk chocolate lost market to dark chocolate which is considered healthier. However, this has not always been the case. Milk chocolate has been presented as a health food since Cadburys first advertised Sloane's Milk Chocolate for its medicinal properties in the 19th Century. The health benefits to children were particularly highlighted. For example, in the 1920s, the Baby Ruth bar was touted as a health food for children by Allan Roy Dafoe, who had gained fame for delivering the Dionne quintuplets. At the same time, advertisements pronounced that chocolate bars combined both a source of essential energy and the "perfectly balanced food" of milk.

The benefits claimed were broad. Cocoa butter, for example, as it coated the teeth, was claimed to reduce tooth decay. Chocolate was claimed to produce calming effects, reducing stress, and even producing a similar feeling to falling in love. Scientific evidence increasingly backed up claims for the health benefits of chocolate. For example, magnetic resonance imaging (MRI) scans have demonstrated that chocolate consumption can reduce the risk of heart disease. A typical milk chocolate bar also contains about  caffeine per , which can stimulate the nervous system and help the body balance its internal water balance. At the same time, the amount of caffeine is a concern to some healthy living advocates. Chocolate is also a source of polyphenols that have antioxidant properties, which may also have health benefits.

Production
Milk chocolate is manufactured from cocoa, milk and sugar. The ingredient which defines the product as chocolate, cocoa bean, is mainly grown in Southeast Asia, South America, and West Africa, particularly the Ivory Coast, which supplies 40 percent of the total global cocoa market. Once the cocoa pods are harvested, the seeds, known as "beans", are removed and fermented, then dried. They are then taken to a processing plant where they are cleaned and roasted. The beans are then ground, usually in a two-stage process, first with an impact mill to liquify the cocoa, and then a ball mill. Milk chocolate usually contains a much larger proportion of cocoa butter than the one that is naturally present in cocoa liquor; unlike dark chocolate, a large part of non-fat cocoa solids is going to be replaced by milk solids. Therefore cocoa butter has to be produced in parallel by separating cocoa liquor into cocoa butter and cocoa powder.

At this stage, the two other key ingredients come into the process. Milk is often added in powdered form as excess water would damage the flowing properties of the liquid chocolate. Spray dried full fat milk powder is normally used, but alternatives include anhydrous full fat or skimmed milk powders. Condensed milk is preferred by some manufacturers, particularly where milk production is seasonal. Milk ingredients are complex and critical in delivering the properties and taste to milk chocolate. Milk-origin (terroir) and associated farming have become an important marketing topic. Milk substitutes like rice milk are also used to create lactose-free milk-like chocolate. Sugar, the last major ingredient, is added at the same time as the milk powder, either in a roll refiner or conche. Sugar is an international commodity, with production of sugar cane led by Brazil, India, Thailand, China and Australia. Sugar beet is also used. Sometimes the milk and sugar are mixed separately before being added to the liquid cocoa mass and cocoa butter. The liquid chocolate is then poured into moulds and formed into bars or any other shape.

Milk chocolate combination bars

At the beginning of the 20th century, bars which combined milk chocolate with other sweet ingredients appeared on both sides of the Atlantic. In 1904, Cailler launched its Branche, a praline-filled and branch-looking bar. Other Swiss chocolatiers, Theodor Tobler and Emil Baumann, invented Toblerone in 1908 which contained almonds, honey and nougat. In the United States, the Goo Goo Cluster was first introduced in 1912 which added caramel, marshmallow and peanuts to the list of ingredients. These were soon followed, in 1914, by Fry's Turkish Delight in the UK. Shortly afterwards, Clark introduced the Clark Bar, which has been called the first combination bar, in 1917.  In 1920, Otto Schnering of the Curtiss Candy Company created the Baby Ruth bar. By 1925, it was the most popular bar in the US. Soon afterwards, two other brands that would become global giants followed, the Mars Bar in 1932 and, three years later, Rowntree's introduced the Kit Kat. By 2014, 650 Kit Kat bars were being consumed each second. Combination bars came to dominate the confectionery market with sales surpassing $140 billion in 2018.

Ethical issues
Ethical issues have been intrinsically linked to chocolate in general since the early days. Many of the early chocolatiers, including Cadbury, Fry's, Rowntree's and Terry's, were founded by Quakers who saw the wellbeing of their workers part of their business ethic. The companies were pioneers in social welfare, providing a safe working environment, high quality housing and other benefits to employees that were ahead of many of the industrial norms. Cadbury, for example, provided paid holidays, insurance and night schools for workers, as well as constructing Bournville in Birmingham, UK. However, the working conditions of many in the wider chocolate supply chain remained poor. Slavery, and later bonded labour, was often employed on the plantations that provided the sugar used to make chocolate. Even after the abolition of slavery, the working conditions in many plantations was still poor, with reports of child labour being frequent and unreported. In 1975, the first in a series of International Cocoa Agreements tried to set what were termed "fair labour conditions" and eliminate child labour.

Rising consumer awareness, as well as greater corporate and employee interest, led to increasing voluntary action to address human rights issues. Fundamental to this has been the rise of Fair Trade and UTZ Certified chocolate. Initially launched by Stichting Max Havelaar in the Netherlands in 1988, the Fair Trade movement expanded into the mainstream in the following decades, with cocoa second to coffee in terms of sales and volume by 2011. Much of this is driven by the use of Fair Trade ingredients by major brands. For example, in Germany, major supermarket Lidl commenced promoting their own brand milk chocolate with their own Fair Trade label in 2006. Similarly, in the UK, two of the best selling milk chocolate bars, Cadburys Dairy Milk and Nestlé's Kit Kat were marketed with a Fair Trade label starting in 2009 and 2010 respectively.

References

Citations

Bibliography

 
 
 
 
   
 
 
 
 
 
 
 
 
 
 
 
 
 
 
 
 
 
 
 
 
 
 
 
 
 
 
 
 

Chocolate confectionery
Types of chocolate